Ojoceratops ( meaning "Ojo Alamo horned face") is a genus of ceratopsian dinosaur which lived in what is now New Mexico, United States. Ojoceratops fossils have been recovered from strata of the Ojo Alamo Formation (Naashoibito Member), dating to the late Cretaceous period (probably Maastrichtian age, 68 million years ago). The type species is Ojoceratops fowleri.

Classification
 
It is very similar to its close relative Triceratops, though it is from an earlier time period and has a more squared-off frill. Nick Longrich, in 2011, noted that the squared-off frill is also found in some true Triceratops specimens and that Ojoceratops is probably a junior synonym of Triceratops, while Holtz (2010) noted that it is probably ancestral to Triceratops and possibly synonymous with the contemporary Eotriceratops.

See also
 Timeline of ceratopsian research

References

Chasmosaurines
Late Cretaceous dinosaurs of North America
Fossil taxa described in 2010
Maastrichtian life
Paleontology in New Mexico
Ojo Alamo Formation
Maastrichtian genus first appearances
Maastrichtian genus extinctions
Ornithischian genera